U.S. Livorno 1915 is an Italian football club based in the town of Livorno, Italy.

History

A.S. Livorno Calcio were one of the original teams competing in Serie A. However, their time in Serie A didn't last long. In 1931, Livorno was relegated back to Serie B, where they spent two years there before being promoted to Serie A again. Livorno fluctuated between Serie A and Serie B until 1943, when they withdrew from the competition due to World War II.

After World War II ended, Livorno still struggled in Serie A and was eventually relegated to Serie B again in 1949. Livorno struggled here as well, and was relegated again to Serie C. In 1955, Livorno was promoted to Serie B again for one season, where they finished 17th and wound up being relegated back to Serie C. Livorno spent the rest of the 1950s and half of the 1960s in Serie C, even after the expansion in 1959. Finally, after six seasons in Serie C, Livorno was promoted to Serie B again.

Livorno's standing positions were erratic for the following years they spent in Serie B. Eventually, in 1972, they were relegated again to Serie C.

Livorno stayed in Serie C until Serie C was split into two categories: Serie C1 and Serie C2. Livorno finished one place ahead of the relegation zone, and would compete in Serie C1 for another five seasons. In 1983, Livorno was relegated to Serie C2 after finishing 15th. After one season, Livorno was promoted to Serie C1 again for another five seasons, before being relegated again to Serie C2. After playing two seasons in Serie C2, the club was cancelled and had to start from the lowest level on the Italian Football ladder, Eccellenza Toscana.

After only one season in Eccellenza Toscana, Livorno was promoted to Campionato Nazionale Dilettanti after finishing first and then promoted again the next year to Serie C2. After four more seasons in Serie C2, the club was promoted to Serie C1 in 1997. Though they dropped from third to twelfth in their first two years back in Serie C1, they eventually rose to seventh, then third, then first to bring themselves back into Serie B.

Livorno played two seasons in Serie B. In the 2002–03 season, they finished tenth, but in the next season they finished third and were promoted to Serie A for the first time since 1949.

Livorno immediately made an impact in the league, finished ninth their first year and finishing sixth the next, qualifying for their first ever UEFA Cup appearance. The next season, however, they dropped down to eleventh and then again in the next season (2007–08) to twentieth, being relegated to Serie B once again.

Livorno was promoted back to Serie A for the 2009–10 season, but then relegated to Serie B that same season, finishing 20th again. Livorno spent three more years in Serie B until being promoted again through playoffs to Serie A, but again only for one season. Livorno was relegated to Serie B in 2014, where they spent two seasons before being relegated again to Lega Pro for the 2016–17 season. In their first year in Lega Pro, Livorno finished 3rd in their respective group (Group A) and qualified for the promotion playoffs, where they were eliminated in the quarterfinals and would therefore remain in Lega Pro the following season. Following the 2016–17 Lega Pro season, the name of the league was changed back to Serie C.

After spending two seasons playing third-division football, Livorno won Group A of the 2017–18 Serie C season and were promoted back to Serie B for the 2018–19 season. They finished 14th, before finishing 20th the following season and being relegated back to Serie C, and were relegated for a second consecutive season after finishing 20th in Group A during the 2020-21 Serie C season.

Seasons

All seasons

Accurate as of 6 July 2021

1938–39: Relegated on goal differential.
1959: GB stands for Group B, which is the league Livorno was placed in when they were in Serie C after the expansion.
1978: Serie C is split into Serie C1 and Serie C2. Livorno managed to finish 11th and qualified for Serie C1. Serie C1 was still split into Groups A and B.
1983–84: Livorno was relegated to Serie C2 and was placed in Group A, where they were promoted after only one season back to Serie C1, where they were placed in Group A.
1991: Club cancelled and forced to start from Eccellenza.
1992–93: League known then as "Campionato Nazionale Dilettanti." GC stands for Group C.
2016–17: GA stands for Group A.

Statistics

Accurate as of 6 July 2021

Key

 P = Played
 W = Games won
 D = Games drawn
 L = Games lost
 F = Goals for

 A = Goals against
 Pts = Points
 Pos = Final position
 T = Tied
 GP = Games played

References

Liv